Dearon Thompson (March 12, 1965 – January 7, 2021), known professionally as Deezer D, was an American actor, rapper and Christian motivational speaker. He is best known for his role as Nurse Malik McGrath in the American medical drama television series ER, and for his roles in the films CB4 and Fear of a Black Hat.

Deezer D's album Delayed, But Not Denied was available on iTunes, and from his website on August 8, 2008. Previously, he released Unpredictable (2002) and Living Up in a Down World (1999), with plans to produce new music in 2021.

At the age of 55, Thompson suffered a fatal heart attack in his Los Angeles home on January 7, 2021.

Filmography
Crowning Jules (2017)
Raven (2011)
A Taste of Us: The Movie (2007)
The Way Back Home (2006)
In the Mix (2005)
Bringing Down the House (2003)
Bones (2001)
Romy and Michele's High School Reunion (1997)
The Great White Hype (1996)
Fear of a Black Hat (1994)
ER (1994–2009)
CB4 (1993)
Cool as Ice (1991)

References

External links

 
 Deezer D at Find a Grave

1965 births
2021 deaths
African-American male actors
African-American male rappers
Male actors from Los Angeles
Rappers from Los Angeles
21st-century American rappers
21st-century American male musicians
20th-century American male actors
21st-century American male actors
20th-century American rappers
20th-century American male musicians
20th-century African-American musicians
21st-century African-American musicians